Beastro by Marshawn Lynch, or simply Beastro, is a Korean restaurant in Portland, Oregon.

History 
Marshawn Lynch, Jun Park, and Kevin Yamada originally planned to open a Hawaiian restaurant at Hotel Vance called Beast, with recipes by Lynch's Filipino grandmother. However, the proposed name conflicted with Naomi Pomeroy's restaurant of the same name. The name 'Beast by Marshawn Lynch & Kama’aina' was changed to 'Beastro'.

See also
 List of Korean restaurants

References

External links 

 
 

Asian restaurants in Portland, Oregon
Korean restaurants in the United States
Korean-American culture in Portland, Oregon
Southwest Portland, Oregon